Stipe Buljan (born 21 September 1983 in Našice) is a former Croatian football player who last played for KF Laçi in the Albanian Superliga.

Club career
In six years at Laçi, Buljan has made 167 league appearances and won two Albanian Cup trophies and one Albanian Supercup trophy.

Honours
KF Laçi
 Albanian Cup (2): 2012–13, 2014–15
 Albanian Supercup (1) : 2015

References

1985 births
Living people
People from Našice
Association football defenders
Croatian footballers
NK Osijek players
NK Zagreb players
HNK Suhopolje players
KF Laçi players
Croatian Football League players
Kategoria Superiore players
Expatriate footballers in Albania
Croatian expatriate sportspeople in Albania